Boston Edison can refer to:

Boston-Edison, a neighborhood in Detroit, Michigan.
Boston Edison Company, a Massachusetts utility now merged into Eversource Energy